Walter Golaski (1913 in Torrington, Connecticut –1996) was an American Mechanical-Bio-Medical Engineer best known for developing Dense Knit Dacron Vascular Prostheses, which were the first practical artificial blood vessel replacements. Golaski died near Philadelphia in 1996 at the age of 83.

Early life and education
Golaski was born in Torrington, Connecticut in 1913. At 16, during the Great Depression, he took a job as a needle mechanic at the Torrington Company, a knitting needle manufacturer, where he soon developed new ideas for the automatic needle manufacturing industry. In 1939, Torrington transferred him to Philadelphia and promoted him to manager, and he enrolled in Drexel University's Mechanical Engineering evening school. He graduated in 1946; Drexel later honored him with many alumni awards.

Inventions
In 1940, Golaski developed a process for rebuilding hosiery machines to enable the knitting industry to make the switch from silk to nylon. In 1945 he opened the Bearing Products Company and with the profits later in 1956 bought and reorganized the Overbrook Knitting Corporation in order to convert existing machinery to produce full fashioned knitted sweaters. He was granted 10 American, 1 British and 2 Canadian patents.

Golaski is best known for the product he developed next, the densely knit Dacron arteries, which he sold through his company Golaski Laboratories. Until this invention, the available replacement blood vessels were stiff, woven, and not sufficiently porous. The Golaski graft offered patients longer life expectancy than any other on the market.

Golaski's business flourished after his invention, but he never forgot his ancestral heritage (he was born and raised in Connecticut but his parents immigrated to the US from Poland). He served as Chairman of the Kosciuszko Foundation. In "which [he] encouraged the exchange of students and scholars between the United States and Poland."  He helped show Poland in a positive light to America in that "Americans of all ethnic backgrounds were encouraged to participate in the Foundation's programs and experience Polish culture directly."

Personal life
Golaski had a wife named Helene Dolores Golaski who died in 1968.  They had a daughter named Michelle. When Helene died, he donated a painting called Young Lady at the Fireplace (signed 1882, Wladyslaw Czachorski) to the Kosciusko Foundation. He later married Alexandra Budna Golaski with whom he had three children, Alexandra, JohnPaul and Edmund. His son, Johnpaul is a freelance sound mixer for the film industry.

References

1913 births
1996 deaths
20th-century American engineers
Drexel University alumni